The canton of Besançon-5 is an administrative division of the Doubs department, eastern France. It was created at the French canton reorganisation which came into effect in March 2015. Its seat is in Besançon.

It consists of the following communes:
 
Amagney
Besançon (partly)
La Chevillotte
Deluz
Fontain
Gennes
Le Gratteris
Mamirolle
Montfaucon
Morre
Nancray
Novillars
Roche-lez-Beaupré
Saône
Vaire
La Vèze

References

Cantons of Doubs